Neopectinimura morobeensis is a moth in the family Lecithoceridae. It is found in Papua New Guinea.

The wingspan is 10 mm. The forewings are relatively short and densely covered with dark brown scales. The hindwings are orange grey and as wide as the forewings.

Etymology
The species name is derived from Morobe, the type locality.

References

Moths described in 2010
morobeensis